Ivica Dukan (born September 27, 1956), also known in the United States by his nickname Duke, is a Croatian basketball scout and former player who is currently the Director of International Scouting and Special Assistant to General Manager for the Chicago Bulls of the National Basketball Association (NBA).

Playing career 
Dukan scored the first three-point field goal in the Yugoslav League after introduction this rule prior to the 1984–85 season.

Dukan played 55 games on the Yugoslavian national basketball team. He represented Yugoslavia at the 1979 Mediterranean Games in Split, Yugoslavia.

Post-playing career 
Since 1991 Dukan has been affiliated to the Chicago Bulls organization. In 1991 he served as a part-time scout for Vice President of Basketball Operations Jerry Krause. On August 20, 1992, he began his role as first Supervisor of European Scouting. Later, he was Director of International Scouting. In 2013, he is promoted to the Special Assistant to the Bulls General Manager Gar Forman.

Personal life 
He and his wife Gordana have a son, Duje (born 1991), who is a professional basketball player. He is the first Croatian who met with 44th President of the United States Barack Obama.

Awards and accomplishments
 FIBA Korać Cup winner: 2 (with Jugoplastika: 1975–76, 1976–77) 
 Yugoslav League champion: 1 (with Jugoplastika: 1976–77) 
 Yugoslav Cup winner: 1 (with Jugoplastika: 1976–77)

References

1956 births
Living people
Chicago Bulls scouts
Chicago Bulls executives
Croatian basketball scouts
Croatian men's basketball players
Croatian expatriate basketball people in the United States
KK Split players
Mediterranean Games silver medalists for Yugoslavia
Competitors at the 1979 Mediterranean Games
Yugoslav men's basketball players
Expatriate basketball people in England
Basketball players from Split, Croatia
National Basketball Association scouts from Europe
Universiade medalists in basketball
Mediterranean Games medalists in basketball
Universiade silver medalists for Yugoslavia
Shooting guards
Medalists at the 1979 Summer Universiade
Yugoslav expatriate sportspeople in England